J. R. Hartley is a fictional character in a popular advertisement promoting the British Yellow Pages, first shown in 1983 when British Telecom was privatised.

Plot
The advertisement shows an elderly gentleman (played by Norman Lumsden) asking in several second hand bookshops for  "Fly Fishing by J. R. Hartley". No bookshop has it, and he goes home dejected. His daughter, sympathising, hands him the Yellow Pages; and one of the shops he phones has a copy. He is delighted. The unheard questioner asks for his name and he responds at dictation speed: 'My name? Oh, yes, it's J. R. Hartley.' The advertisement ends by promoting the Yellow Pages, the voiceover provided by actor Joss Ackland.

Reception
In 2015, a poll was carried out to mark the 60th anniversary of the first British television advertisement break. This advertisement was rated fifth most popular with 7% of the vote.

Legacy
Author Michael Russell wrote and published a spoof called Fly Fishing: Memories of Angling Days, by J. R. Hartley in 1991.  The book was a best seller and led to two additional best sellers under the pseudonym J. R. Hartley: J.R. Hartley Casts Again – More Memories of Angling Days (1992) and Golfing by J. Hartley (1995). When Lumsden died on 28 November 2001 at the age of 95, the advertisement was broadcast again in his memory, nearly 20 years after its first appearance. In February 2011, Yellow Pages re-made the advertisement, with fictional DJ Day V. Lately searching for a copy of his trance remix Pulse and Thunder, which was released for sale at the same time.

In a nod to the original advert, Yellow Pages' online site Yell.com hold an annual award ceremony for their employees, the awards are called "The Yell Hartley Awards"

See also
 I, Libertine
 List of pseudonyms of angling authors

References

External links
 The advert on YouTube

Advertising characters
Male characters in advertising
1983 in British television
British television commercials
Pseudonymous writers
Mascots introduced in 1983